Inside Out is the debut album by singer-actress Emmy Rossum, released on October 23, 2007. In the second week of its release the album entered the U.S. Billboard 200 at number 199. As of May 11, 2008, the album had sold 28,090 copies in the US. The cover and album photos were shot at Pier 54 in Santa Monica by photographer Brian Bowen Smith. Though the album only spent one week on the Billboard 200, it spent 55 weeks on the Billboard Top New Age Albums chart and 8 weeks on the Heatseekers chart. Lead single "Slow Me Down" missed the Billboard Hot 100, but spent 72 weeks on the New Age Digital Songs chart and 2 weeks on the Hot Canadian Digital Singles chart. Inside Out was the 7th best-selling New Age album and Emmy Rossum was the 4th best-selling New Age artist of 2008.

Producer Stuart Brawley received a 2009 Juno award nomination for his work on the album.

Inside Out - EP

On July 31, three songs and a 17:56-seconds making-of documentary (filmed by documentary filmmaker Doug Biro) were released on iTunes under the name "Inside Out - EP."  As of August 4, it was the 8th top album overall and the 2nd top pop album.

Those songs are:
 "Slow Me Down" 2:34
 "Stay" 3:15
 "Falling" 3:40
 "Inside Out Documentary (Long Version)" 17:56 video.

Track listing

Music videos
 "Slow Me Down" (Directed by Thomas Kloss)
 "Falling" (Directed by Adam Egypt Mortimer)

Personnel
 Emmy Rossum — Writer, Vocals
 Stuart Brawley — Producer, Writer, Mixer, Keyboards, Bass, Programming, String Arrangements, Synth
 Joe Corcoran — Engineer, Digital Editing, Guitar, Programming
 Abe Laboriel, Jr. — Drums
 Sean Hurley — Bass

Chart positions

Album

Singles

Year-end charts

References

External links
 Official Site
 Official Geffen Records Site
 Official MySpace

2007 debut albums
Emmy Rossum albums
Geffen Records albums